Wilson County is a county located in the U.S. state of North Carolina. As of the 2020 census, the population was 78,784. The county seat is Wilson. The county comprises the Wilson Micropolitan Statistical Area, which is also included within the Rocky Mount–Wilson–Roanoke Rapids Combined Statistical Area.

History
On February 13, 1855, the North Carolina General Assembly established Wilson County "out of portions of Edgecombe, Johnston, Nash, and Wayne Counties." The county was named for Colonel Louis D. Wilson, U.S. Volunteers, who died of fever while on leave from the state senate during the Mexican–American War.

Wilson Speedway held 12 NASCAR Cup Series races at the county fairgrounds in Wilson between 1951 and 1960. The half mile dirt track operated between 1934 and 1989.

Geography

State and local protected site
 Tobacco Farm Life Museum

Major water bodies
 Black Creek
 Buckhorn Reservoir
 Contentnea Creek
 Lake Wilson
 Silver Lake
 Wiggins Mill Reservoir

Adjacent counties
 Nash County – north
 Edgecombe County – northeast
 Pitt County – east
 Greene County – southeast
 Wayne County – south
 Johnston County – southwest

Major highways

 
  (Small section incomplete)

Major infrastructure 
 Amtrak Thruway (Wilson Station)
 Wilson Industrial Air Center
 Wilson Station

Demographics

2020 census

As of the 2020 United States census, there were 78,784 people, 32,384 households, and 19,760 families residing in the county. The population density was 199 people per square mile (77/km2). There were 30,729 housing units at an average density of 83 per square mile (32/km2). There were 28,613 households, out of which 31.90% had children under the age of 18 living with them, 48.10% were married couples living together, 16.50% had a female householder with no husband present, and 30.90% were non-families. 26.40% of all households were made up of individuals, and 10.20% had someone living alone who was 65 years of age or older. The average household size was 2.51 and the average family size was 3.03.

In the county, the population was spread out, with 25.60% under the age of 18, 9.10% from 18 to 24, 28.80% from 25 to 44, 23.60% from 45 to 64, and 12.90% who were 65 years of age or older. The median age was 36 years. For every 100 females there were 91.30 males. For every 100 females age 18 and over, there were 87.20 males.

The median income for a household in the county was $33,116, and the median income for a family was $41,551. Males had a median income of $30,364 versus $21,997 for females. The per capita income for the county was $17,102. About 13.80% of families and 18.50% of the population were below the poverty line, including 24.70% of those under age 18 and 21.30% of those age 65 or over.

Government and politics
Wilson County government is a member of the regional Upper Coastal Plain Council of Governments. It has several law-enforcement agencies:
 Wilson County Sheriff's Office
 Wilson Police Department (City of Wilson)
 Stantonsburg Police Department (Town of Stantonsburg)
 Black Creek Police Department (Town of Black Creek)
 Sharpsburg Police Department (Town of Sharpsburg)

Communities

City

 Wilson (county seat and largest city)

Towns

 Black Creek
 Elm City
 Kenly (part)
 Lucama
 Saratoga
 Sims
 Stantonsburg
 Sharpsburg (part)

Unincorporated communities

 Montclair
 New Hope
 Rock Ridge
 Lamms Crossroads

Townships

 Black Creek
 Cross Roads
 Gardners
 Old Fields
 Saratoga
 Springhill
 Stantonsburg
 Taylors
 Toisnot
 Wilson

See also

 List of counties in North Carolina
 List of places named after people in the United States
 National Register of Historic Places listings in Wilson County, North Carolina
 Rocky Mount–Wilson Regional Airport, Airport just north of Wilson county in Nash County.
 List of future Interstate Highways

References

Further reading

External links

 
 
 Wilson County Genealogical Society

 
North Carolina counties

1855 establishments in North Carolina
Populated places established in 1855
Majority-minority counties in North Carolina